Sukasto Efendi (born 21 January 1981) is an Indonesian former footballer who plays as a goalkeeper.

Club career

Kalteng Putra
He was signed for Kalteng Putra to play in Liga 2 in the 2020 season. This season was suspended on 27 March 2020 due to the COVID-19 pandemic. The season was abandoned and was declared void on 20 January 2021.

References

External links
 Sukasto Efendi at Soccerway
 Sukasto Efendi at Liga Indonesia

Indonesian footballers
Living people
1981 births
Sportspeople from Malang
Persema Malang players
Liga 1 (Indonesia) players
Indonesian Premier League players
Indonesian Premier Division players
Association football goalkeepers